Mamadou Pathé Diallo is a Guinean Politician, Doctor and Diplomat, who is the current Minister for Public Health.

Career 
He has been a Professor of Paediatrics since 1988. Recently head of the Medical Centre & Health Counselling (CEMECO) in Kipé as well as the Paediatric, Haematology and Oncology Unit at Conakry University Hospital. He is a member of the Guinea National Ethics Committee for Health Research (CNERS), West African College of Physicians (WACP), the Franco-African Group of Pediatric Oncology (GFAOP) and the Guinean Association of Biosecurity and Biosafety (AGUIBIOS). He has been a district Chief Medical Officer, Head of Department at Conakry University Hospital, Minister of Health, Director of the Regional Institute of Public Health (IRSP) of Cotonou in Benin, and a Representative of WHO. He pioneered the implementation of Primary Health Care (Bamako Initiative) in Guinea. He has worked in many African countries representing various U.N. organizations including work for UNPF in Mali and Sierra Leone, work for the UNDP in Eritrea as well as work for WHO in Mauritania, work for UNAIDS in Senegal, work for MONUSCO in DRC, work for UNIOGBA in Guinea-Bissau.

He was named Minister of Health on Monday October 25, 2021, replacing Remy Lamah.

References 

Living people
Health ministers of Guinea
Guinean politicians
21st-century Guinean people
Gamal Abdel Nasser University of Conakry alumni
San Diego State University alumni
Year of birth missing (living people)